This is an alphabetized list of notable all-female bands, of all genres, and is a spin-off list from the all-female band article. It is an overview of notable all-female bands that have their own articles. 

A band is a group of musicians who are organized for ensemble playing.  An all-female band is a band which has consisted entirely of female musicians for at least three-quarters of its active career.

This article only lists all-female bands who perform original material that is either authored by themselves or authored by another musician for that band's use. All-female tribute acts, cover bands and vocal groups, are not included. Fictional all-female bands, such as those created for scripted television programs, are also not included.

Other

The 5,6,7,8's (Japan) (1986–)
 Yoshiko "Ronnie" Fujiyama, Sachiko Fujii, Akiko Omo
21st Century Girls (United Kingdom) (1998–2000)
Leanne Garner, Fiona Garner, Kate Turley, Meriam "Mim" Mohammad, Charlotte Fendek
 7 Year Bitch (United States)
 Valerie Agnew, Lisa Faye Beatty, Elizabeth Davis, Roisin Dunne, Stefanie Sargent, Selene Vigil

A
 The Ace of Cups (United States) (1967–1972; 2017–)
 Mary Gannon, Marla Hunt, Mary Ellen Simpson, Diane Vitalich, Denise Kaufman
 The Aces (United States) (2016–)
 Katie Henderson, McKenna Petty, Alisa Ramirez, Cristal Ramirez
 Adickdid (United States) (1991–1995)
 Kaia Wilson, Nalini Deedee (d.d.) Cheriel, SaraBellum
 Audrey (Sweden) (2001–)
 Victoria Scoglund, Anna Tomlin, Emelie Molin, Rebecca Kristiansson
 Afrirampo (Japan) (2002–2010; 2016–)
 Oni, Pikachu
 Ajaqa (Australia)
Erica Ajaka, Tracy Ajaka, Catherine Ajaka, Mary Ajaka
 Aldious (Japan)
 Yoshi, Toki, Sawa, Rin, Marina
 The All Girl Summer Fun Band (United States)
 Kim Baxter, Ari Douangpanya, Kathy Foster, Jen Sbragil
 Aly & AJ (United States) (2004–)
 Aly Michalka, AJ Michalka
 American Girls (United States)
 Brie Howard, Teresa James, Hillary Shepard, Debbie Tressler, Miiko Watanabe
 Amiina (Iceland)
 Edda Run Olafsdottir, Solrun Sumarlidadottir, Hildur Arsaelsdottir, María Huld Markan Sigfusdottir
 The Amorettes (United Kingdom)
 Gill Montgomery, Hannah McKay, Heather McKay
 Androids of Mu (United Kingdom) (1979–1983)
 Suze da Blooze, Corrina, Cozmic, Bess
 Antigone Rising (United States) (1998–)
 Cassidy, Cathy Henderson, Kristin Henderson, Jen Zielenbach, Dena Tauriello,
 Aphasia (Japan)
 Yumi Kondoh, Sumiko 'Goe' Ishikawa, Kyoko 'Kyon' Morita, Junko 'Jun' Takeda
 The Applicators (United States) 
 Erica, Kristina, Sabrina, Stephanie

 The Aquanettas (United States) (1987–1995)
 Jill Richmond, Deborah Schwartz, Stephanie Seymour, Claudine Troise
 Ars Nova (Japan)
 Arven (Germany)
 Astarte (Greece)
 Maria "Tristessa" Kolokouri, Hybris, Derketa
 Au Revoir Simone (United States)
 Erika Forster, Annie Hart, Heather D'Angelo
 Autoclave (United States)
 Melissa Berkhoff, Christina Billotte, Nikki Chapman, Mary Timony
 Azure Ray (United States) (2001–2004; 2008–)
 Maria Taylor, Orenda Fink

B
 The 'B' Girls (Canada) (1977–1979)
 Babes in Toyland (United States) (1987–2001; 2014–2020)
 Kat Bjelland, Lori Barbero, Michelle Leon, Maureen Herman
 Baby in Vain (Denmark)
 Lola Hammerich, Benedicte Pierleoni, Andrea Thuesen
 Band-Maid (Japan)
 Saiki Atsumi, Miku Kobato, Kanami Tōno, Akane Hirose, Misa
 The Bangles (United States) (1981–1989; 1998–)
 Susanna Hoffs, Debbi Peterson, Vicki Peterson, Michael Steele, Annette Zilinskas, Abby Travis
 BarlowGirl (United States)
 Alyssa Barlow, Rebecca Barlow, Lauren Barlow
 The Beaches (Canada) (2013–)
 Jordan Miller, Kylie Miller, Leandra Earl, Eliza Enman-McDaniel
 BeBe K'Roche (United States) (1973–1976)
 original members – Tiik Pollet, Peggy Mitchell, Jake Lampert, Virginia Rubino; occasional members – Pat Ramseyer, Ajida, Matu Feliciano, Cindy Mason; additional recording musicians – Jerene O'Brien, Matu Feliciano,  Jasmin Telfair
 The Be Good Tanyas (Canada)
 Frazey Ford, Samantha Parton, Trish Klein
 Bellatrix (Iceland)
 Elíza M Geirsdóttir, Sigrún Eiríksdóttir, Ester Bíbí Ásgeirsdóttir, Birgitta Vilbersdóttir 
 Bella Tromba (UK)
 The Belle Stars (United Kingdom)
 Stella Barker, Clare Hirst, Miranda Joyce, Jennie McKeown, Sara-Jane Owen, Judy Parsons, Lesley Shone
 Betty Blowtorch (United States)
 Blare N. Bitch, Bianca Butthole, Judy Molish, Sharon Needles
 Betty Boop (Serbia)
 Tara Krlić, Anja Prošić, Nina Doroškov, Kristina Krpogačin
 Big Joanie (United Kingdom)
 Stephanie Phillips, Chardine Taylor-Stone, Estella Adeyeri
 The Big Moon (United Kingdom) (2014–present) 
Juliette Jackson, Fern Ford, Celia Archer, Soph Nathan
 Big Trouble (United States)
 Bobbie Eakes, Julia Farey, Rebecca Ryan, Suzy Zarow, Bess Motta, Heli Sterner, Cece Worrall
 Birtha (United States) (1968–1975)
 Shele Pinizzotto, Rosemary Butler, Sherry Hagler, Olivia "Liver" Favela
The Black Belles (United States)
 Olivia Jean, Ruby Rogers, Christina Norwood, Shelby Lynne O'Neal, Erin Belle
 Blaxy Girls (Romania)
 Rucsandra Iliescu, Anamaria Nanu, Amalia Tirca, Gela Marinescu, Cristina Marinescu
 Blue Rose (United States)
 Cathy Fink, Laurie Lewis, Marcy Marxer, Molly Mason, Sally Van Meter
 Bleach03 (Japan)
 Kanna, Miya, Sayuri

 The Bodysnatchers (United Kingdom) (1979–1981)
 Stella Barker, Rhoda Dakar, Miranda Joyce, Pennie Leyton, Sarah Jane Owens, Jane Summers, Nikki Summers
 Bond (United Kingdom/Australia)
 Haylie Ecker, Eos Chater, Tania Davis, Gay-Yee Westerhoff, Elspith Hanson
 boygenius (United States)
 Julien Baker, Phoebe Bridgers, Lucy Dacus
 Boye (Serbia)
 original lineup: Biljana Babić, Jasna Manjulov, Ljiljana Radaković, and Klaudija Gavrilović
 Bones Apart (United Kingdom)
 Becky Smith, Jayne Murrill, Helen Vollam, and Lorna McDonald
 Bratmobile (United States)
 Molly Neuman, Erin Smith, Allison Wolfe
 Bridear (Japan)
 Kimi, Haru, Ayumi, Natsumi, Moe 
 Broadzilla (United States)
 Rachel May, Kim Essiambre, Angie Manly
 Burning Witches (Sweden)
 Laura Guldemond, Sonia Nusselder, Seraina Telli, Romana Kalkuhl, Lala Frischknecht, Jay Grob
 The Butchies (United States) (1998–2005)
 Alison Martlew, Kaia Wilson, Melissa York

C
 Cacadou Look (Yugoslavia)
 Jasmina Simić, Tatjana Simić, Suzana Kožić, Tamara Vrančić, Sandra Vrančić, Giovanna Kirinić, Alenka Medinković
 Cadallaca (United States)
 Sarah Dougher, Junior, Corin Tucker
 Celtic Woman
 Chloë Agnew, Lisa Kelly, Lisa Lambe, Susan McFadden, Mairead Nesbitt
 Cake Like (United States)
 Nina Hellman, Kerri Kenney, Jody Seifert
 Calamity Jane (1980s) (United States)
 Mary Fielder, Mary Ann Kennedy, Linda Moore, Pam Rose
 Calamity Jane (1990s) (United States)
 Gilly Ann Hanner, Megan Hanner, Lisa Koenig
 Candy (Malaysia)
 Patricia Robert, Mary David, Connie David, Nancy Gregory
 Care Bears on Fire (United States)
 Sophie, Isadora "Izzy", Jena
 Chai (Japan)
 Mana, Kana, Yuki, Yuna
 Chalk Circle (United States)
 Sharon Cheslow, Anne Bonafede, Mary Green, Jan Pumphrey, Tamera Lyndsay
 Chatmonchy (Japan)
 Eriko Hashimoto, Akiko Fukuoka, Kumiko Takahashi
 Cherri Bomb (American rock band)
 Julia Pierce, Miranda Miller, Nia Lovelis, Rena Lovelis
 Cherry Boom (Republic of China)
 Cha Cha, Kwa, Hsiao Tsien, Ta Tien
 The Capricorns (United States)
 Kirsten Nordine, Heather Lynn
 The Chicks (United States) (1990–)
 Martie Maguire, Emily Robison, Natalie Maines, Laura Lynch, Robin Lynn Macy
 Chicks on Speed (United States/Germany/Australia)
 Alex Murray-Leslie, Melissa Logan
 Childbirth (United States)
 Julia Shapiro, Stacy Peck, Bree McKenna
 Chocolate, Menta, Mastik (Israel)
 Yardena Arazi, Ruthie Holzman and either Tami Azaria (1972–1973) or Leah Lupatin
 Cibo Matto (United States)
 Cimorelli (United States)
 Christina Cimorelli, Katherine Cimorelli, Lisa Cimorelli, Amy Cimorelli, Lauren Cimorelli, Dani Cimorelli
 Civet (United States)
 Liza Graves Riersgard, Suzi Homewrecker, Christian Riersgard, Jonny Grill
 Client (United Kingdom)
 Kate Holmes, Nicole Thomas, Sarah Blackwood, Emily Mann

 The Coathangers (United States)
 Meredith Franco, Julia Kugel, Stephanie Luke
 Cobra (China)
 Yang Ying, Yu Jin, Wang Xiaofang, Xiao Nan
 Cobra Killer (Germany)
 CocoRosie (France)
 Bianca Cassady, Sierra Cassady
 Cookie Crew (United Kingdom)
 Susie Banfield, Debbie Pryce
 The Continental Co-ets (United States) (1963–1967)
 Nancy Hofmann, Carol Goins, Vicki Steinman, Carolyn Behr, MaryJo Hofmann 
 The Contractions (United States)
 Mary Kelley, Kathy Peck, Debbie Hopkins
Conquer Divide (United States), (United Kingdom), (Serbia)
 Kiarely Castillo, Janel Duarte, Kristen Woutersz, Isabel Johnson, Tamara Tadic, Ashley Colby
 Cowboy Crush (United States)
 Trenna Barnes, Debbie Johnson, Becky Priest, Renaé Truex
 Coyote Sisters (United States)
 Leah Kunkel, Marty Gwynn, Renee Armand
 Crucified Barbara (Sweden)
 Mia Coldheart, Klara Force, Ida Evileye, Nicki Wicked, Joey Nine
 Cub (Canada)
 Lisa G., Robynn Iwata, Lisa Marr
 Cyntia (Japan)
 Saki, Yui, Ayano, Azu
 Cypher in the Snow (United States)
 Anna Joy Springer, Dan-yella Dyslexia, Shari Lambchop, Ulla Imd, Margaret Hitchcock, Chloe Little Hope, Lala Hulse

D

Daddy Issues (United States)
Jenna Moynihan, Jenna Mitchell,  Emily Maxwell
The Daisy Chain (United States) (1967–1968)
Shel Le, Camille, Rosemary Lane, Dee Dee Lea
 The Deadly Nightshade (United States) (1967–1970; 1972–1977; 2008–)
 Helen Hooke, Anne Bowen, and Pamela Brand
 Dead Disco (United Kingdom)
 Victoria Hesketh, Lucy Catherwood, Marie France
 The Devotchkas (United States)
 Jessica, Mande, Alaine, Gabrielle
 Dickless (United States)
 Jana McCall, Kerry Green, Kelly Canary, Lisa Smith
 Dog Party (United States) 
 Gwendolyn Giles, Lucy Giles
 Doll Skin (United States)
 Meghan Herring, Sydney Dolezal, Nicole Rich, Alex Snowden
 Dolly Mixture (United Kingdom)
 Rachel Bor, Hester Smith, Debsey Wykes
 The Donnas (United States)
 Brett Anderson, Allison Robertson, Maya Ford, Amy Cesari, Torry Castellano
 Drain STH (Sweden)
 Martina Axén, Flavia Canel, Anna Kjellberg, Maria Sjöholm
 Dream Nails (United Kingdom)
 Janey Starling, Anya Pearson, Lucy Katz, Mimi Jasson 
 Dum Dum Girls (United States)
 Dee Dee, Jules, Malia, Sandy

E

 Electrelane (United Kingdom)
 Debbie Ball, Mia Clarke, Rachel Dalley, Emma Gaze, Tracey Houdek, Ros Murray, Verity Susman
 Emily's Sassy Lime (United States)
 Wendy Yao, Emily Ryan, Amy Yao
 Erase Errata (United States)
 Ellie Erickson, Jenny Hoyston, Sara Jaffe, Bianca Sparta
 Everlife (United States)
 Amber, Sarah and Julia Ross (sisters)
 eX-Girl (Japan)
 Keikos, Kirilola, Yoko
 Ex Hex (United States)
 Mary Timony, Betsy Wright, Laura Harris
 Exist Trace (Japan)
 Jyou, Miko, Omi, Naoto and Mally.
 The Eyeliners (United States)
 Laura, Gel, lisa.

F
 Fabulous Disaster (United States)
 Lynda Mandolyn, Squeaky, Sally Disaster, Lizzie Boredom, Cinder Block, Laura Litter 
 The Faders (United Kingdom)
 Molly Lorene, Toy Valentine, Cherisse Osei
 Fanny (United States) (1969–1975)
 Nickey Barclay, Alice de Buhr, Jean Millington, June Millington, Patty Quatro, Brie Howard Darling
 The Feminine Complex (United States) (1966–1969)
 Mindy Dalton, Judi Griffith, Lana Napier, Pame Stephens, Jean Williams
 Femme Fatale (United States) (2013–2019)
 Lorraine Lewis, Courtney Cox, Nita Strauss, Nikki Stringfield, Janis Tanaka, Rachael Rine, Athena Lee (Kottak), Katt Scarlett
Fifth Column (Canada)
Caroline Azar, G.B. Jones, Anita Smith, Charlotte Briede, Beverly Breckenridge, Michelle Breslin, Donna Dresch, Torry Colichio
Finally Punk (United States)
 Erin Budd, Stephanie Chan, Veronica Ortuño, Elizabeth Skadden
 Fire Party (United States)
 Amy Pickering, Natalie Avery, Kate Samworth, Nicky Thomas
 First Aid Kit (Sweden)
Klara Söderberg, Johanna Söderberg
 Fluffy (United Kingdom)
 Angie Adams, Bridget Jones, Amanda Rootes, Helen Storer
 Flying Lesbians (Germany)
 Danielle de Baat, Monika Jaeckel, Gigi (Christa) Lansch, Monika Mengel, Cillie Rentmeister, M.S., Christel Wachowski, Swetlana Freifrau von dem Bottlenberg
 Frau (United Kingdom); (Spain)
 Ashley, Colette, Paula, Nuria
 Free Kitten (United States)
 Kim Gordon, Julie Cafritz
 Frightwig (United States)
 Deanna Ashley, Mia Levin, Cecilia Lynch, Megan Page, Rebecca Tucker

G

 Gacharic Spin (Japan)
 F Chopper Koga, Tomo-zo, Hana, Oreo Reona, Mai
 Gallhammer (Japan)
 Mika Penetrator, Vivian Slaughter, Risa Reaper
 Girlpool (United States)
 Avery Tucker, Harmony Tividad
 The Girls (United States)
 Diane, Rosemary, Sylvia and Margaret Sandoval
 Girlschool (United Kingdom)
 Jackie Chambers, Denise Dufort, Kim McAuliffe, Enid Williams, Kelly Johnson, Gil Weston-Jones, Cris Bonacci, Jackie Bodimead, Tracey Lamb
 Girl in a Coma  (United States)
 Nina and Phanie Diaz, Jenn Alva
 Girl Monstar (Australia)
 Sherry Valier, Anne McCue, Damian Child, Sue World
 Gito Gito Hustler (Japan)
 Yago, Mitsuko, Tae, Fusa
 Go Betty Go  (United States)
 Nicolette and Aixa Vilar, Betty Cisneros, Michelle Rangel
 Go-Bang's (Japan)
 Kaori Moriwaka, Risa Tanishima, Mitsuko Saito
 The Go-Go's (United States)
 Elissa Bello, Charlotte Caffey, Belinda Carlisle, Margot Olavarria, Gina Schock, Kathy Valentine, Jane Wiedlin
 The Gymslips (United Kingdom)
 original line up: Suzanne Scott, Paula Richards, Karen Yarnell, Kathy Barnes

H

 Haiku Salut (United Kingdom)
 Gemma Barkerwood, Sophie Barkerwood, Louise Croft
 Haim (United States)
 Este Haim, Danielle Haim, Alana Haim
 Halo Friendlies (United States)
 Natalie Bolanos, Cheryl Hecht, Deanna Moody, Ginger Reyes, Claudia Rossi, Christina Theobold, Judita Wignall
 Hang On The Box (China)
 Wang Yue, Yilina, Shenggy (Shi Lu)
 Harry Crews (United States)
 Kim Gordon, Lydia Lunch, Sadie Mae
 The Heart Beats (United States)
 Linda Sanders, Debbie Sanders, Debbie McMillan, Jeannie Foster
 Heavens to Betsy (United States)
 Tracy Sawyer, Corin Tucker
 Hepburn (United Kingdom)
 Jamie Benson (vocals), Lisa Lister (guitar), Sarah Davies (bass), Beverley Fullen (drums)
 Hijas de Violencia (Mexico)
 Hinds (Spain)
 Carlotta Cosials, Ana Perrote, Ade Martin, Amber Grimbergen
 The Holy Sisters of the Gaga Dada (United States)
 Jill Fido, Mary Jean, Kim Sockit, Zero Jessephski Jr.
 Honeyblood (Scotland)
 Stina Marie Claire Tweeddale

I

  Ibeyi (Cuba)
 Lisa-Kaindé Diaz, Naomi Diaz
 Indica (Finland)
 Johanna "Jonsu" Salomaa, Heini, Sirkku, Jenny, Laura
 Indigo Girls (United States)
 Amy Ray, Emily Saliers
International Sweethearts of Rhythm (United States)
 Members inc. Pauline Braddy, Willie May Wong, Edna Williams, Helen Jones Woods; Bandleader: Anna Mae Winburn.
 Isis (United States)
 Stella Bass, Ginger Bianco, Lollie Bienenfeld, Lauren Draper, Jeanie Fineberg, Suzi Ghezzi,
Ivy Benson's All Girls Band (United Kingdom)
 Ivy Benson et al.
 Ivy Lies (New Zealand)
 Emla Palmer, Lisa Blatchford, Rosie O'Connell, Mihka Chee

J

 Jack Off Jill (United States)
 Jessicka, Hellen Storer, Tenni Ah-Cha-Cha, Michelle Inhell
 The Jades (Ireland)
 Sheila O'Sullivan, Elaine Weldon, Caroline Weldon, Yvonne O'Sullivan
 Jale (Canada)
 Eve Hartling, Alyson MacLeod, Jennifer Pierce, Laura Stein
 Joseph (United States)
 Natalie Closner Schepman, Allison Closner, Meegan Closner
 Junkyard Lipstick (South Africa)
 Lucinda Villain, Louise Gorman, Robyn Bruwer, Jo-mariè Smit

K

 Katzenjammer (Norway)
 Anne Marit Bergheim, Marianne Sveen, Solveig Heilo, Turid Jørgensen
 Kitten Forever (United States)
 Corrie Harrigan, Laura Larson, Liz Elton
 Kittie (Canada)
 Morgan Lander, Mercedes Lander, Tara McLeod, Trish Doan, Talena Atfield, Jennifer Arroyo, Tanya Candler, Fallon Bowman, Lisa Marx, Ivana "Ivy" Vujic 
 Kleenex (Switzerland)
 Lislot Ha, Marlene Marder, Klaudia Schiff, Regula Sing
 Klymaxx (United States)
 Bernadette Cooper, Lorena Porter, Joyce Irby, Lynn Malsby, Robbin Grider, Cheryl Cooley
 Kostars (United States)
 Vivian Trimble, Jill Cunniff
 KSM (United States)
 Shelby Cobra, Katie Cecil, Sophia Melon, Shae Padilla and Kate Cabebe
 The Kut (United Kingdom)
 Princess Maha, Diana Bartmann, Stella Vie

L

L7 
Donita Sparks, Suzi Gardner, Jennifer Finch, Demetra Plakas
 La Luz (United States)
 Shana Cleveland, Alice Sandahl, Lena Simon
 L.A. Witch (United States)
 Ellie English, Irita Pai, Sade Sanchez
 Lash (Australia)
 Belinda-Lee Reid, Jaclyn Pearson, Jessica Bennett, Micaela Slayford
 Le Tigre (United States)
 Sadie Benning, Johanna Fateman, Kathleen Hanna, JD Samson
 Lesbians On Ecstasy (Canada)
 Bernie Bankrupt, Fruity Frankie, Jackie the Jackhammer, Veronique Mystique
 Let's Eat Grandma (United Kingdom)
 Jenny Hollingworth, Rosa Walton
 The Like (United States)
 Charlotte Froom, Tennessee Thomas, Z. Berg
 LiLiPUT (Switzerland)
 Angie Barrack, Crigle Freund, Lislot Ha, Marlene Marder, Klaudia Schiff
 The Linda Lindas
 Bela Salazar, Eloise Wong, Lucia de la Garza, Mila de la Garza
 LiveOnRelease (Canada)
 Leah Emmott, Felicity Herst, Brittin Karroll, Collette Trudeau 
 The Liverbirds (England)
Valerie Gell, Pamela Birch, Mary McGlory, Sylvia Saunders
 Lolita No. 18 (Japan)
 Aya, Ena, Masayo Ishizaka, Kim Rin
 Look Blue Go Purple (New Zealand)
 Kathy Bull, Norma O'Malley, Lesley Paris, Denise Roughan, Kath Webster
 The Lounge Kittens (Britain)
 Zan Lawther, Timia Gwendoline, Jenny Deacon
 Lovendor (Japan)
 Reina Tanaka, Marina Okada, Yuki Uozumi, Marin Miyazawa
 Lovebites (Japan)
 Asami, Miho, Haruna, Midori, Miyako
 Lunachicks (United States) 
 Becky, Chip, Gina, Theo Kogan, Sindi, Squid
 Lung Leg (Scotland)
 Jane McKeown, Annie Spandex, Amanda Doorbar, Maureen Quim
 Luscious Jackson (United States)
 Jill Cunniff, Gabby Glaser, Kate Schellenbach, Vivian Trimble
 Luv'd Ones (United States)
 Char Vinnedge, Chris Vinnedge, Mary Gallagher, Faith Orem

M

 M2M (Norway)
 Marion Elise Raven, Marit Elisabeth Larsen
 Madam X (as Hell's Belles, 1991; United States)
 Lenita Erickson, Irene Wohlman, Roxy and Maxine Petrucci
 Magneta Lane (Canada)
 Lexi Valentine, French, Nadia King
 Malaria! (Germany)
 Gudrun Gut, Bettina Köster, Beate Bartel, Manon P. Duursma, Christine Hahn, Sussane Kuhnke
 Mambo Taxi (United Kingdom)
 Lenie Mets, Delia Sparrow, Andrea Stallard, Karin Rapp, Ella Guru, Anjali Bhatia
 Maow (Canada)
 Tobey Black, Neko Case, Corrina Hammond
 Marine Girls (United Kingdom)
 Tracey Thorn, Jane Fox, Alice Fox, Gina Hartman
 Marsheaux (Greece)
 Marianthi Melitsi, Sophie Sarigiannidou
 Mary's Blood (Japan)
Eye, Mari, Rio, Saki
 Mediæval Bæbes (UK)
 Maple Bee, Katharine Blake, Audrey Evans, Marie Findley, Emily Ovenden, Claire Rabbitt, Cylindra Sapphire
 The Micragirls (Finland)
 Mari Halonen, Katariina Haapalainen, Kristiina Haapalainen
 Mika Miko (United States)
 Jenna Thornhill, Jennifer Clavin, Michelle Suarez, Jessie Clavin, Kate Hall (lineup from 2005 to 2009)
 The Mo-dettes (United Kingdom)
 Ramona Carlier, Jane Crockford, Kate Korus, June Miles-Kingston, Melissa Ritter
 Morfonica (Japan)
 Mashiro Kurata (Amane Shindō), Tōko Kirigaya (Hina Suguta), Nanami Hiromachi (Yūka Nishio), Tsukushi Futaba (Mika), Rui Yashio (Ayasa)
 Mrs. Fun (United States)
 Kim Zick, Connie Grauer
MUNA (United States)
 Katie Gavin, Josette Maskin, Naomi McPherson
 The Murmurs (United States)
 Heather Grody, Leisha Hailey, Sheri Ozeki, Sherri Solinger
 MT-TV (England)
 Krow, Alex, Brooke, Fuse, Nikki, Jo

N
 Nasty Cherry (United States)
 Nemophila (Japan)
 Nice Horse (Canada)
 Katie Rox, Brandi Sidoryk, Krista Wodelet, Tara McLeod
 Nisennenmondai (Japan)
Masako Takada, Yuri Zaikawa, Sayaka Himeno
 Nitocris (Australia)
 Morgana Ancone, Jessamine Finlayson, Sara Graye, Andrea Stanway, Kira Taylor
 Northern State (United States)
 Hesta Prynn, Correne Spero, Robyn "Sprout" Goodmark
Nots (United States)
Natalie Hoffman, Charlotte Watson, Alexandra Eastburn, Meredith Lones

O

 Octavia Sperati (Norway)
 Silje, Bodil, Gyri, Trine, Tone
 OOIOO (Japan)
 Yoshimi P-We, Kayan, Aya, Ai
 Oreskaband (Japan)
 iCas, Hayami, Tomi, Tae, ADD, CC
 The Organ (Canada)
 Katie Sketch, Jenny Smythe, Shelby Stocks, Shmoo Ritchie, Debra Cohen
 Otoboke Beaver (Japan)
 Accorinrin, Yoyoyoshie, Hiro-Chan, Kahokiss

P

 The Pack A.D. (Canada)
 Maya Miller, Becky Black 
 The Pandoras (United States)
 Paula Pierce, Gwynne Kahn,  Karen Blankfeld, Melanie Vammen, Kim Shattuck, Bambi Conway, Lissa, Sheri, Casey, Lisa Black, Sheri Kaplan
 Peaness (United Kingdom)
 Carleia "Balla" Babenta, Jess Branney, Rach Williams
 Partyline (United States)
 Allison Wolfe, Angela Melkisethian, Crystal Bradley
 The Peggies (Japan)
 Nadia Javed, Beverley Ishmael, Harriet Doveton
 Phantom Blue (United States)
 Gigi Hangach, Michelle Meldrum, Nicole Couch, Kim Nielsen, Linda McDonald.
 The Pierces (United States)
 Catherine Pierce, Allison Pierce
 PINS (United Kingdom)
 Faith Holgate, Lois McDonald, Anna Donigan, Sophie Galpin
 Plastiscines (France)
 Katty Besnard, Marine Neuilly, Louise Basilien, Anoushka Vandevyvere
 The Pleasure Seekers/Cradle (United States)
 Patti Quatro, Suzi Quatro, Arlean Quatro, Nancy Quatro, Darline Arnone, Nancy Ball, Mary Lou Ball, Diane Baker
 Plumtree (Canada)
 Lynette Gillis, Carla Gillis, Amanda Braden, Catriona Sturton
 Pony Up (Canada)
 Lisa J. Smith, Sarah Moundroukas, Laura Wills, Lindsay Wills (and formerly, Camilla Wynne Ingr)
 Poppin'Party (Japan)
 Kasumi Toyama (Aimi), Tae Hanazono (Sae Ōtsuka), Rimi Ushigome (Rimi Nishimoto), Sāya Yamabuki (Ayaka Ōhashi), Arisa Ichigaya (Ayasa Itō)
The Prettiots (United States)
 Lulu Landolfi, Kay Kasparhauser
 Princess Princess (Japan)
 Atsuko Watanabe (b), Kanako Nakayama (g), Kyoko Tomita (d), Tomoko Konno (k), Kaori Kishitani (v)
 The Priscillas (United Kingdom)
 Jenny Drag (v), Guri Go-Go (g), Heidi Heelz (b), Lisa Lux (d)
 Pussy Riot (Russia)
  Nadezhda Tolokonnikova, Maria Alyokhina, Yekaterina Samutsevich, Taisia Krugovykh, et al.

R
 Rachel Rachel (United States)
 Jennifer York, Cheryl Jewell, Heli Sterner, Brynn Beltran (Gersmehl), Jennifer Sparks, Robin Spurs
 The Raincoats (United Kingdom)
 Vicky Aspinall, Gina Birch, Ana Da Silva, Palmolive, Ingrid Weiss
 Genya Ogurtsova, Natasha Shchelkova, Lena Tretyakova, Anya (Nyuta) Baidavletova
 Raise A Suilen (Japan)
 Rei Wakana (Raychell), Rokka Asahi (Riko Kohara), Chiyu Tamade (Risa Tsumugi), Masuki Satō (Natsume), Reona Nyūbara (Reo Kurachi)
 Rasputina (United States)
 Melora Creager, Julia Kent, Zoe Keating, Sarah Bowman, Kris Cowperthwaite, Agnieszka Rybska, Nana Bornant 
 Razika (Norway)
 Maria Amdam, Maria Råkil, Marie Moe, Embla Karidotter Dahleng
 Rebecca & Fiona (Sweden)
 Red Aunts (United States)
 Terri Wahl, Kerry Davis, Debi Martini, Leslie Noelle
 Red Bacteria Vacuum (Japan)
 Ikumi, Kassan (also formerly known as RanRan), Jasmine
 Red Molly (United States)
 Laurie MacAllister, Abbie Gardner, Carolann Solebello (Solebello left August 19, 2010, replaced by Molly Venter)
 Red Poppy (China)
 Group of female percussionists
 Reyna (United States) (2011–present)
 Gabriela Banuelos, Victoriah Banuelos
 Rock Goddess (United Kingdom)
 Jody Turner, Julie Turner, Tracey Lamb, Dee O'Malley
 Rolling Quartz (South Korea)
 Iree, Arem, Jayoung, Yeongeun, Hyunjung
 Roselia (Japan)
 Yukina Minato (Aina Aiba), Sayo Hikawa (Haruka Kudō), Lisa Imai (Yuki Nakashima), Ako Udagawa (Megu Sakuragawa), Rinko Shirokane (Kanon Shizaki).  Former members Yurika Endō (as Lisa Imai), Satomi Akesaka (as Rinko Shirokane)
 The Runaways (United States)
 Cherie Currie, Lita Ford, Jackie Fox, Joan Jett, Sandy West, Vicki Blue, Laurie McAllister, Micki Steele

S 
 Sahara Hotnights (Sweden)
 Maria Andersson, Jennie Asplund, Johanna Asplund, Josephine Forsman
 Salem 66 (United States)
 Judy Granwald, Elisabeth Kaplan, Susan Merriam 
 Savages  (United Kingdom)
 Jehnny Beth, Gemma Thompson, Ayse Hassan, Fay Milton
 Scandal (Japan)
 Haruna Ono, Tomomi Ogawa, Mami Sasazaki, and Rina Suzuki
 Scarlet (United Kingdom)
 Cheryl Parker, Jo Youle, Joanna Fox
 Scissor Girls (United States)
 Azita Youssefi, Heather Melowic (a.k.a. Heather M.), Kelly Kuvo, Sue Zollinger
 Scrawl (United States)
 Marcy Mays, Sue Harshe, Carolyn O'Leary, Dana Marshall 
 Screaming Orphans  (Ireland)
Joan Diver, Angela Diver, Joan Diver, Gráinne Diver
Screamin' Sirens (United States)
 Laura Bandit, Diane Dixon, Genny Schorr, Fur Dixon, Rosie Flores, Pleasant Gehman, Casey Gomez, Kathryn Grimm, Marsky Reins, Miiko Watanabe
 September Girls (Ireland)
 Paula Cullen, Caoimhe Derwin, Lauren Kerchner, Jessie Ward, Sarah Grimes
 Shampoo (United Kingdom)
 Jacqui Blake, Carrie Askew
 The Shaggs (United States)
 Betty Wiggin, Dorothy Wiggin, Helen Wiggin, Rachel Wiggin
 She Devils (Argentina)
 Inés Laurencena, Patricia Pietrafesa, Pilar Arrese
 She Rockers (United Kingdom)
 Donna McConnell, Alison Clarkson, Dupe Fagbesa, Antonia Jolly 
 The She Trinity (United States)
Robyn Yorke, Shelley Gillespie, Sue Kirby, Pauline Moran, Marion Hill, Eileen Woodman, Janet Baily, Barbara Thompson, Beryl Marsden, Inger Jonnsson
 Shishamo (Japan)
 Asako Miyazaki, Misaki Yoshikawa, Aya Matsuoka
 Shit & Chanel (Denmark)
 Anne Linnet, Astrid Elbek, Lis Sørensen, Lone Poulsen and Ulla Tvede Eriksen.
 Shonen Knife (Japan)
 Naoko Yamano, Atsuko Yamano, Risa Kawano (past members:  Ritsuko Taneda, Emi Morimoto, Etsuko Nakanishi, Michie Nakatani, Mana Nishiura)
 Show-Ya (Japan)
 Keiko Terada, Miki "sun-go" Igarashi, Miki "captain" Nakamura, Satomi Senba, Miki "mittan" Tsunoda
 Sick of Sarah (United States)
 Abisha Uhl, Katie Murph, Jessie Farmer, Brooke Svanes, Jessica Forsythe
 Sidi Bou Said (United Kingdom)
 Claire Lemmon, Gayl Harrison, Melanie Woods
 Silent Siren (Japan)
 Sumire Yoshida, Yukako Kurosada, Aina Yamauchi, Hinako Umemura 
 Skinned Teen (United Kingdom)
 Layla Gibbon, Flossy White, Esme Young
 Skinny Girl Diet (United Kingdom)
 Delilah Holliday, Ursula Holliday
 Skulker (Australia)
 Greer Skinner, Naomi Battah, Annette Harada, Angela Blackshaw
 Slant 6 (United States)
 Christina Billotte, Marge Marshall, Myra Power
 Sleater-Kinney (United States)
 Carrie Brownstein, Lora McFarlane, Corin Tucker, Janet Weiss
 The Slits (United Kingdom)
 Ari Up, Palmolive, Viv Albertine, Tessa Pollitt
 Smoosh (United States)
 Chloe, Asy (Asya), Maia 
 Some Girls (United States)
 Heidi Gluck, Juliana Hatfield, Freda Love
 Spazzys (Australia)
 Kat Spazzy, Lucy Spazzy, Ally Spazzy
 Spires That in the Sunset Rise (United States)
 Kathleen Baird, Georgia Vallas, Taralie Peterson (Taralie Dawn), Tracy Peterson
 Spitboy (United States)
 Michelle Gonzales, Adrienne Droogas, Paula, Karin Gembus
 Splendora (United States)
 Janet Wygal, Tricia Wygal, Delissa Santos, Cindy Brolsma, Jennifer Richardson 
 The Staves (United Kingdom)
 Emily Stavely-Taylor, Jessica Stavely-Taylor, Camilla Stavely-Taylor
 Stealing Sheep (United Kingdom)
 Rebecca Hawley, Emily Lansley, Lucy Mercer
 Stereopony (Japan)
 Aimi, Nohana, Shiho
 Stonefield (Australia)
 Amy, Hannah, Sarah, and Holly Findlay
 Strawberry Switchblade (Scotland)
 Rose McDowall, Jill Bryson
 Super Junky Monkey (Japan)
 Mutsumi ‘623’ Fukuhara, Keiko, Shinobu Kawai, Matsudaaahh
 Super Heroines (United States)
 Eva O, Sandra Ross, Jill Emery

T

 Tattle Tale (United States)
 Jen Wood, Madigan Shive
 Team Dresch (United States)
 Jody Bleyle, Donna Dresch, Kaia Wilson, Marci Martinez, Melissa York
 Tegan and Sara (Canada)
 Tegan Quin, Sara Quin 
 The Third Sex (United States)
 Trish Walsh, Peyton Marshall
 Thunderbugs (United Kingdom)
 Brigitta Jansen, Nicky Shaw, Stef Maillard, Jane Vaughan
 Thunderpussy (United States)
 Molly Sides, Whitney Petty, Leah Julius, Ruby Dunphy
 The Trashwomen (United States)
 Tina Lucchesi, Danielle Pimm, Elka Zolot
 Those Dancing Days (Sweden)
 Linnea Jönsson, Cissi Efraimsson, Mimmi Evrell, Rebecka Rolfart, Lisa Pyk Wirstrom 
 Thug Murder (Japan)
 Ryoko Naitoh, Chisato Ohtsubo, Yurie Sakuma
 Tijuana Sweetheart (United States)
 Hellion, LoWreck, Julie TwoTimes, Smokey; Former Members: Elena, Leeanne, Scrotch, Ivhanna Rock
 Tiktak (Finland)
 Emilia "Emppu" Suhonen, Mirjami "Mimmu" Hyvönen, Nea Mokkila, Petra Mauria, Tuuli Taimi, Noora Puhakka
 Tribe 8 (United States)
 Lynn Breedlove, Leslie Mah, Jen Rampage, Mama T
 The Tuts (United Kingdom)
 Yuuho Kitazawa, Makiko Ishiwata, Miku Onuki
 Twelve Girls Band, Traditional (China)
 Two Nice Girls (United States)
 Pam Barger, Barbara Cole, Laurie Freelove, Meg Hentges, Kathy Korniloff, Gretchen Phillips

U

 Uh Huh Her (United States)
 Leisha Hailey, Camila Grey
 Uncle Earl (United States)
 KC Groves, Abigail Washburn, Rayna Gellert, Kristin Andreassen
 Upset (United States)
 Ali Koehler, Lauren Freeman, Patty Schemel, Rachel Gagliardi
 Urban Symphony (Estonia)
 Sandra Nurmsalu, Mann Helstein, Johanna Mängel, Mari Möldre
 Ut (United States/United Kingdom)
 Jacqui Ham, Sally Young, Nina Canal

V

 Vanilla Ninja (Estonia)
 Lenna Kuurmaa, Piret Järvis, Katrin Siska, Maarja Kivi, Triinu Kivilaan
 Viuda e hijas de Roque Enroll (Argentina)
 Mavi Díaz, María Gabriela Epumer, Claudia Ruffinatti, Claudia Sinesi
 Vivian Girls (United States)
 Cassie Ramone, Kickball Katy, Ali Koehler, Frankie Rose
 Vixen (United States)
 Janet Gardner, Jan Kuehnemund, Share Pedersen (Ross), Roxy Petrucci (Jones), Maxine Petrucci, Gina Stile, Brittany "Britt Lightning" Denaro, Kathrin Kraft, Lynn Louise Lowrey, Jenna Piccolo (Sanz-Agero), Tamara Ivanov, Pia Maiocco, Laurie Hedlund, Lorraine Lewis
 Voice of Baceprot (Indonesia)
 Firda Marsya Kurnia, Widi Rahmawati, Euis Siti Aisyah
 Von Iva (United States)
 Jillian Iva Meador, Rebecca Kupersmith, Kelly Harris 
 Voodoo Queens (United Kingdom)
 Anjali Bhatia, Ella Drauglis, Angela Bhasler, Rajru Bhatia, Stefania
 Vulpes (Spain)
 Loles Vázquez «Anarkoma Zorrita», Mamen Rodrigo «Evelyn Zorrita», Begoña Astigarraga «Ruth Zorrita», Lupe Vázquez «Pigüy Zorrita»

W

 The Wailin' Jennys (Canada)
 Nicky Mehta, Ruth Moody, Heather Masse
 The Warning (Mexico)
 Daniela Villareal, Paulina Villareal, Alejandra Villareal
 Warpaint (United States)
 Emily Kokal, Jenny Lee Lindberg, Stella Mozgawa, Theresa Wayman
 Wet Leg (United Kingdom)
 Rhian Teasdale, Hester Chambers
 We've Got a Fuzzbox and We're Gonna Use It (United Kingdom)
 JoAnn, Maggie, Tina, Vicky
 Whiteberry (Japan)
 Yuki, Aya, Yukari, Rimi, Erika
 The Whoreshoes (United States)
 Diana Greenberg, Lala Hulse, Camilla Lincoln, Joni Rueter, Emily Stucky
 Wild Flag (United States)
 Carrie Brownstein, Rebecca Cole, Mary Timony, Janet Weiss
 Wild Rose (United States)
 Pamela Gadd, Kathy Mac, Pam Perry, Nancy Given Prout, Wanda Vick
 The Wimmins' Institute (United Kingdom)
 Jennifer Denitto, Cassie Fox, Melissa Reardon, Deborah van der Geugten
 Wishing Chair (United States)
 Miriam Davidson, Kiya Heartwood

Y
 Y Pants (United States)
 Barbara Ess, Virginia Piersol, Gail Vachon

Z
 Zelda (Japan)
 Sachiho Kojima, Sayoko Takahashi, Yōko Suzuki, Kuniko Nozawa, Fukie Ishihara, Ako Ozawa, Naomi Motomura
 Zone (Japan)
 Miyu Nagase, Mizuho Saito, Maiko Sakae, Tomoka Nishimura

See also
List of girl groups

References

 List
Female
Bands